Linghe District is a district of the city of Jinzhou, Liaoning, People's Republic of China.

Administrative divisions
There are 11 subdistricts within the district.

Subdistricts:
Zhengda Subdistrict, Longjiang Subdistrict, Majia Subdistrict, Baigu Subdistrict, Tiexin Subdistrict, Kangning Subdistrict, Ling'an Subdistrict, Juyuan Subdistrict, Jintie Subdistrict, Liuhua Subdistrict, Shiqiaozi Subdistrict

References

External links

County-level divisions of Liaoning
Jinzhou